Teanu (or Puma, Buma) is the main language spoken on the island of Vanikoro, in the easternmost province of the Solomon Islands.

About the language

Name

The language receives its name from Teanu, the island located northeast of the Vanikoro island group. The same language has also been known in the literature as Puma (or wrongly Buma), after the main village of Teanu island.

Sources
The very first source about the languages of Vanikoro were wordlists collected in 1834 by French naturalist Joseph Paul Gaimard, as he took part in the first voyage of Astrolabe (1826-36) led by Dumont d'Urville. On top of his botanical and zoological work, Gaimard collected, and later published, about ten pages of wordlists in Teanu, Tanema and Lovono. In this work, the three languages were labelled respectively “Tanéanou”, “Tanema”, and “Vanikoro”.

More data was collected in the 1980s by Australian linguist Darrell Tryon; he described Teanu using the name “Buma”.

The languages of Vanikoro are currently being studied by French linguist Alexandre François.

Geographical distribution
Whereas Teanu used to be confined to the northeast part of the island group, during the 20th century it became the main language of the whole island group of Vanikoro, at the expense of the two other indigenous languages Lovono and Tanema.

While the Melanesian population of Vanikoro now speaks Teanu, the southern coast of the island also has been colonised for a few centuries by a Polynesian population, who still keep strong ties with their homeland, the nearby island of Tikopia. Their main language is Tikopia, even though some speak Teanu as a second language.

Phonology
The phoneme inventory of Teanu includes 19 consonants and 5 vowels.

Consonants 

The labiodental fricative /v/ can be freely devoiced , especially word-initially. By contrast, the phoneme /s/ is always heard voiceless.

Teanu does not have a phonemic palatal glide //: the sound [j] only exists as an allophone of /i/ before another vowel: e.g. iebe [i.e.ᵐbe] ~ [je.ᵐbe] ‘besom, broom’.

Vowels 
Teanu has 5 phonemic vowels, /i e a o u/.

Tryon (2002) proposed that vowel length may be contrastive, but more recent research has found this to be incorrect: the language only has five short vowels .

Notes

References

 François, Alexandre (2021). Online Teanu–English dictionary, with equivalents in Lovono and Tanema. Electronic publication, open access. Paris: CNRS.

External links
 Basic vocabulary list in Teanu (Buma) (site: ABVD)
 Audio recordings in the Teanu language, in open access, by Alexandre François (source: Pangloss Collection of CNRS).

Languages of the Solomon Islands
Temotu languages
Definitely endangered languages